Antigonish was a federal electoral district in Nova Scotia, Canada, that was represented in the House of Commons of Canada from 1867 to 1917. It was created in the British North America Act, 1867. The federal riding was dissolved in 1914 into the riding of Antigonish—Guysborough. It consisted of the County of Antigonish.

Geography

This riding was set by the British North America Act, 1867 to consist of Antigonish County. The boundaries were not changed during the electoral redistributions of 1872, 1882, 1892 or 1903. This riding was dissolved into Antigonish—Guysborough during the 1914 redistribution. The county was legally defined in 1828 (as Sydney County) as:
Commencing at a slate rock, on the Eastern side of the falls of the River Ekimsegam, and at a post and pile of stones marked on the west side CH on the Eastern side CS from thence running North twenty five miles and a quarter of a mile to a square post surrounded by a pile of stones marked SC on the east and HC on the west side from thence running south eighty five degrees, east fourteen miles to a square post and pile of stones marked CS on the Eastern side and CH on the western side, thence running north twenty six miles to the shore of the Gulf of St. Lawrence to a square post surrounded by a pile of stones and marked on the east side CS on the west side CH thence easterly along the shore to the entrance of the Gut of Canso, and by a line drawn through the centre of said Gut southerly to the southern entrance of the same, thence westerly and southerly along the shores of Chedabucto Bay, and easterly along the shore of said bay, and westerly by the southern shore of the province, to Ekimsegum aforenamed comprehending all the Islands in front of the foregoing limits save the Island of Cape Breton, and its appendant Isles.

Members of Parliament

Election results

See also 

 List of Canadian federal electoral districts
 Past Canadian electoral districts

Notes

References

External links 
Riding history for Antigonish (1867–1914) from the Library of Parliament

Former federal electoral districts of Nova Scotia